Deb or DEB may refer to:

People
 Deb (surname)
 Deb (given name)
 A débutante

DEB
 Dynamic energy budget theory, a metabolic theory
 Epidermolysis bullosa dystrophica
 German Ice Hockey Federation (Deutscher Eishockey Bund)
 Diepoxybutane, an industrial chemical
 Distant Education Bureau, India
 New South Wales 900/800 class railcar, Australia

Other uses
 deb (file format), Debian
 Debrecen International Airport IATA airport code
 Deb Shops, a former US clothing chain
 Deb (album), 2005, by Souad Massi

See also
 Debs (disambiguation)
 Debra (disambiguation)
 Debbie (disambiguation)
 Deborah (disambiguation)